Yuncheng is the southernmost prefecture-level city in Shanxi province, People's Republic of China. It borders Linfen and Jincheng municipalities to the north and east, and Henan (Luoyang and Jiyuan to the east, Sanmenxia to the south) and Shaanxi (Weinan) provinces to the east, south and west, respectively. As of the 2020 census, its population was 4,774,508 inhabitants (5,134,779 in 2010), of whom 928,334 (680,036 in 2010) lived in the built-up (or metro) area made of Yanhu District. One can note than Pinglu County, 205,080 inhabitants in the south, is now part of Sanmenxia built-up (or metro) area.

History

In early China, it was the location of the state of Kunwu. Yuncheng was the site of the Yuncheng Campaign (三打运城), battle between the Kuomintang army and the People's Liberation Army during Chinese civil war.

The famous general Guan Yu from the late Han Dynasty was also born in this region.

Archaeology 
In July 2022, archaeologists announced a discovery of a 2.8 cm long 5.200 years old stone carving chrysalis in a semi-crypt house at the Shangguo Site in Wenxi County. Archaeologists made suppositions that this house may have belonged to the Yangshao Culture period, based on the unearthed pottery pieces. According to archaeologist Tian Jianwen, discovery of stone carving chrysalises provided significant information for the study of the silkworm culture in China.

Administration
There are 13 county-level administrative divisions under Yuncheng‘s jurisdiction, including 1 district, 10 counties and 2 county-level cities. The Municipal executive, legislature and judiciary are in Yanhu District, together with the CPC and Public Security Bureau.

Climate
Yuncheng has a continental, monsoon-influenced semi-arid climate (Köppen BSk), with four distinct seasons. Due to its southerly location and position to the north of the Zhongtiao Mountains, allowing for downsloping when winds are from the south, it is among the warmest locales in the province. Winters are cold and very dry, while summers are hot and humid. Over 60% of the annual rainfall occurs from June to September. With monthly percent possible sunshine ranging from 45% in March to 54% in May and July, the city receives 2,219 hours of bright sunshine annually, low by Shanxi standards and North China.

Notable people
 Guan Yu, general and deified historical figure
 Jing Haipeng, PLAAC astronaut
 Zhang Ziyi, Chinese zootechnician

Transportation
China National Highway 209
G59 Hohhot–Beihai Expressway
Datong–Xi'an Passenger Railway, with frequent service to Beijing, Taiyuan, and Xi'an. Besides the Yuncheng North Railway Station (near Yuncheng's central city), the railway also has stations at Yongji and Wenxi.
Yuncheng Zhangxiao Airport

Notes and references

 
Prefecture-level divisions of Shanxi
Cities in Shanxi